Barr is an unincorporated community in Sangamon County, Illinois, United States.

References

Unincorporated communities in Sangamon County, Illinois
Unincorporated communities in Illinois